This is a list of notable Christian preachers.

Early Church 

 Stephen (?–34) Stoned
 James (?–44) Apostle
 Barnabas (?–61) Disciple
 Paul (5–67) Beheaded
 Peter (?–67) Crucified
 Mark (?–68) Gospel of Mark
 Philemon (?–68) Epistle to Philemon
 Luke (?–84) Four Evangelists
 Timothy (17–97) Ephesus
 John (6–100) Book of Revelation
 Silas (?–100) Silvanus of the Seventy
 Ignatius (35–107) Apostolic Fathers
 Titus (?–107) Paul the Apostle
 Simeon (?–117) Jewish Christian
 Polycarp (69–155) Bishop of Smyrna
 Matthew (?) Bible
 Ananias (?) Jesus
 Apollos (?) New Testament
 Priscilla and Aquila (?) Christian Missionary
 Stephanas (?) Apostle Paul

Roman Catholic 

 Peter Chrysologus (406–450)
 Pope Leo I (400–461)
 Fulgentius of Ruspe (c 462–533)
 Martin of Braga (520–580)
 Saint Boniface (675–754)
 Saint Dominic (1170–1221)
 Anthony of Padua (1195–1231)
 Johannes Tauler German Dominican (1300–1361), his 80 sermons in German were read for centuries after his death
 Oliver Maillard, French Franciscan (c.1430–1502)
 Savonarola Italian Dominican (1452–1498) famous for the Bonfire of the Vanities in Florence, finally executed for heresy
 John of Capistrano (1386–1456), Italian Franciscan, working in Central Europe, where he led resistance to a Turkish invasion 
 Vincent Ferrer (1350–1419) Spanish Dominican 
 Bernardino of Siena (1380–1444), emotive Italian
 Julian Maunoir (1606–1683) French Jesuit "Apostle of Brittany" 
 Tomasz Młodzianowski (1622–1686), Polish Jesuit
 Paolo Segneri (1624–1694), Italian Jesuit
 Junípero Serra, (1713–1784)
 Jacques-Bénigne Bossuet (1627–1704)
 Louis Bourdaloue (1632–1704), Jesuit
 Tobia Lionelli (1647–1714), Slovene in Order of Friars Minor Capuchin 
 Jean Baptiste Massillon (1663–1742)
 Theobald Mathew (1790–1856), Irish Capuchin and temperance reformer 
 Aloysius Gentili (1801–48) Italian Rosminian, working in England 
 Charles Coughlin (1891–1979)
 Fulton J. Sheen (1895–1979)

Pre-Reformation 
 John Wycliffe (1320–1384) Lollards
 Jan Hus (1369–1415)

Lutheran 

 Martin Luther (1483–1547) The Ninety-Five Theses
 Philipp Melanchthon (1497–1560)
 Lars Levi Laestadius (1800–1861)
 Bernt B. Haugan (1862) 
 C.F.W. Walther (1811–1887)
 Martin Niemöller (1892–1984)
 Dietrich Bonhoeffer (1906–1945)
 Walter A. Maier (1893–1950)
 J.A.O. Preus II (1920–1994)
 Gerhard Forde (1927–2005)
 Rod Rosenbladt (1942–present)
 Gerald B. Kieschnick (1943–present)
 Mark Hanson (1946–present)
 Matt Harrison (1962–present)

Calvinist 

 John Oecolampadius (1482–1531)
 Huldrych Zwingli (1484–1531)
 Martin Bucer (1491–1551)
 Peter Martyr Vermigli (1500–1562)
 Wolfgang Musculus (1497–1563)
 Andreas Hyperius (1511–1564)
 John Calvin (1509–1564)
 Guillaume Farel (1489–1565)
 Heinrich Bullinger (1504–1575)

Presbyterian 
 John Knox (1513–1572) Protestant Reformation
 Charles Grandison Finney (1792–1875)
 Lyman Beecher (1799–1863)
 Jonathan Goforth (1859–1936) Canadian Presbyterian Mission
 Peter Marshall (1903–1949) New York Avenue Presbyterian Church
 James Montgomery Boice (1938–2000) Tenth Presbyterian Church in Philadelphia
 Ian Paisley (1926–2014)
 Frederick Buechner (1926–present)
 D. James Kennedy (1930–2007) Coral Ridge Presbyterian Church
 R.C. Sproul (1939–2017) Ligonier Ministries
 Tim Keller (1950–present)

Anglican 
 Hugh Latimer (1470–1555) Oxford Martyrs
 Thomas Cranmer (1489–1556) Oxford Martyrs
 Lancelot Andrewes (1555–1626)
 John Donne (1572–1631)
 John Tillotson (1630–1694)
 John Newton (1725–1807) Author of Amazing Grace
 Laurence Sterne (1713–1759), mainly in book form
 Samuel Clapham (known as Theophilus St. John) (1755–1830)
 J. C. Ryle (1816–1900)
 Phillips Brooks (1835–1893)
 John Stott (1921–2011)
 Dick Lucas (1925–present)
 John Chapman (evangelist) (1930–2012)
 Peter Jensen (1943–present)
 Phillip Jensen (1945–present)
 N. T. Wright (1948–present)
 Michael Bruce Curry (1953–present)
 Nicky Gumbel (1955–present)

Puritan 
 John Harvard (1607–1638)
 Joseph Alleine (1634–1668)
 John Davenport (1597–1670)
 Matthew Henry (1662–1714)
 Jonathan Edwards (1703–1758)
 G. Campbell Morgan (1863–1945)
 Martyn Lloyd-Jones (1899–1981)

Baptist 

 Balthasar Hubmaier (1480–1528) (Anabaptist)
 Roger Williams (1603–1684) (Reformed/Particular Baptist)
 John Bunyan (1628–1688) (Reformed/Particular Baptist)
 William Kiffin (1616–1701)
 Benjamin Keach (1640–1704) (Reformed/Particular Baptist)
 John Gill (1697–1771) (Reformed/Particular Baptist)
 Isaac Backus (1724–1806)
 Andrew Fuller (1754–1815)
 Robert Hall (1764–1831) 
 William Carey (1761–1834) (Reformed/Particular Baptist)
 Christmas Evans (1755–1838)
 William Miller (1782–1849)
 Adoniram Judson (1788–1850) (Reformed/Particular Baptist)
 William Garrett Lewis (1834–1885)
 Charles Spurgeon (1834–1892) Metropolitan Tabernacle (Reformed/Particular Baptist)
 John Alexis Edgren (1839–1908)
 Alexander Maclaren (1826–1910)
 Oswald Chambers (1874–1917)
 George W. Truett (1867–1944)
 Harry A. Ironside (1876–1951)
 J. Frank Norris (1877–1952)
 Mordecai Ham (1877–1961)
 Martin Luther King Jr. (1929–1968) (Non Trinitarian, non confessional)
 Harry Emerson Fosdick (1878–1969)
 George Beauchamp Vick (1901–1975)
 John R. Rice (1895–1980)
 Lester Roloff (1914–1982)
 Joseph Harrison Jackson (1900–1990)
 Curtis Hutson (1934–1995)
 Jack Hyles (1926–2001)
 Wally Criswell (1909–2002) Southern Baptist Convention
 Stephen F. Olford (1918–2004)
 Adrian Rogers (1931–2005)
 Jerry Falwell (1933–2007)
 Lee Roberson (1909–2007)
 Neiliezhü Üsou (1941–2009)
 Peter Ruckman (1921–2016)
 Billy Graham (1918–2018) (non confessional)
 Charles Stanley (1932–present)
 Tony Campolo (1935–present)
 Kent Hovind (1953–present)
 Paul Washer (1961–present)

Methodist 

 George Whitefield (1714–1770)
 Daniel Rowland (1713–1790)
 John Wesley (1703–1791)
 Francis Asbury (1747–1816)
 Peter Cartwright (1785–1873)
 William Booth (1829–1912) The Salvation Army
 Bob Jones, Sr. (1883–1968) Bob Jones University
 Leslie Weatherhead (1893–1976) 
 William Willimon (1946–present)

Independent 
 Nicolaus Zinzendorf (1700–1760), Moravian Church
 Dwight L. Moody (1837–1899) Moody Bible Institute
 R. A. Torrey (1856–1928) Church of the Open Door
 Billy Sunday (1862–1935) Evangelist
 A.W. Tozer (1897–1963) Christian and Missionary Alliance
 J. Vernon McGee (1904–1988) Church of the Open Door
 Walter Martin (1928–1989) Christian Research Institute
 Paris Reidhead (1919–1992) Christian and Missionary Alliance
 Leonard Ravenhill (1907–1994) Evangelist
 David Wilkerson (1931–2011) Times Square Church
 Chuck Smith (1927–2013) Calvary Chapel
 John MacArthur (1939–present) Grace Community Church
 Ravi Zacharias (1946–2020) Christian apologist
 John Piper (1946–present)

Seventh-day Adventist 
 Joseph Bates (1792–1872) Great Disappointment
 James White (1821–1881) Adventist Review
 John Nevins Andrews (1829–1883) Andrews University
 Ellen G. White (1827–1915) Conflict of the Ages (book series)
 James Edson White (1849–1928) Review and Herald Publishing Association
 H.M.S. Richards, Sr. (1894–1985) Voice of Prophecy
 George Vandeman (1916–2000) It Is Written
 Mark Finley (1945–present) It Is Written

Church of Christ 
 Walter Scott (1796–1861)
 Batsell Baxter (1886–1956)
 Marshall Keeble (1878–1968)
 Batsell Barrett Baxter (1916–1982)
 Ira North (1892–1984)
 Kenneth W. Wright (1945–present)

Pentecostal 
 Smith Wigglesworth (1859–1947) Pentecostalism
 William J. Seymour (1870–1922) Azusa Street Revival
 Charles Parham (1873–1929) Speaking in tongues
 F. F. Bosworth (1877–1958)
 Aimee Semple McPherson (1890–1944) Foursquare Church
 William Branham (1909–1965) Faith Healer, prophet
 A. A. Allen (1911–1970)
 James Gordon Lindsay (1906–1973) Faith Healer
 Kathryn Kuhlman (1907–1976) Faith Healer
 Derek Prince (1915–2003) Faith, spiritual warfare, demonology
 Kenneth E. Hagin (1917–2003) Word of Faith
 Jack Coe (1918–1956)
 Oral Roberts (1918–2009) Oral Roberts University
 Yiye Ávila (1925–2013)
 Morris Cerullo (1931–2020) Pentecostalism, evangelist
 Jimmy Swaggart (1935–present) Assemblies of God
 David Yonggi Cho (1936–present) Yoido Full Gospel Church, Assemblies of God Discipleship, church Growth
 Jim (1940–present) Tammy Bakker (1942–2007) Assemblies of God televangelists
 Reinhard Bonnke (1940–2019) evangelist
 William Kumuyi (1941–present)
 Ezekiel H. Guti (1923–present) Forward in Faith Ministries International
 Steven Furtick (1980–present)

Charismatic 
 Paul Cain (1929–2019) Kansas City Prophets
 John Wimber (1934–1997) Vineyard Movement
 Kenneth Copeland (1936–present)
 Benson Idahosa (1938–1998) Word of Faith
 Enoch Adeboye (1942–present) Redeemed Christian Church of God, Servant of Yahweh
 Joyce Meyer (1943–present)
 Benny Hinn (1952–present) Prosperity theology
 David Oyedepo (1954–present) Living Faith Church Worldwide
 T.D. Jakes (1957–present) Prosperity theology
 Nicholas Duncan-Williams (1957–present) Faith, Spiritual Warfare, Prayer
 Mensa Otabil (1959–present) Prosperity theology
 Dag Heward-Mills (1963–present) Evangelist & Crusades, Church Growth, Church Planting, Loyalty & Disloyalty 
 Joseph Prince (1963–present) Prosperity theology
 Joel Osteen (1963–present) Prosperity theology
 Chris Oyakhilome (1963–present) Christ Embassy
 General But Naked (1971–present) the End Time Train Evangelistic Ministries Inc.

Preachers with secular professions 
 Thomas Hopkins Gallaudet (1787–1851)
 Ralph Waldo Emerson (1803–1882)
 William Gannaway Brownlow (1805–1877)
 James Garfield (1831–1881)
 Eric Liddell (1902–1945)
 Hugh Beaumont (1903–1984)
 Carl Stuart Hamblen (1908–1989)
 Jerry Clower (1926–1998)
 Fred Rogers (1928–2003)
 Bill Moyers (1935–present)
 Joe Simon (1936–2021)
 John Danforth (1936–present)
 Grady Nutt (1937–1982)
 Solomon Burke (1940-2010)
 Clifton Davis (1945–present)
 Al Green (1946–present) 
 Eddie Holman (1946–present) 
 George Foreman (1949–present)
 Mike Huckabee (1955–present)
 Ernie Fletcher (1956–present)
 Reggie White (1961–2004)
 John Battle (1962-present)
 Richard Rossi (1963–present)
 Raphael Warnock (1969-present)
 Kirk Cameron (1970–present)
 Napoleon Kaufman (1973-present)
 Kel Mitchell (1978–present)
 Darryl Strawberry (1962-present)

Gallery

References

Lists of Christians